The 1954 Syrian coup d'état took place in February of that year to overthrow the government of Adib Shishakli. Leading the anti-Shishakli movement were former President Atassi and the veteran Druze leader Sultan al-Atrash.

Background
Colonel Adib Shishakli came to power by a coup in December 1951, forming a military autocracy. As the leader of Syria, Adib Shishakli recognized the desires of Syria's Arab majority, and accordingly adopted a policy of pan-Arabism. He clashed frequently with the independent-minded Druze minority on the Jabal Druze mountain, accusing them of wanting to topple his government using funds from Jordan, and in 1954 resorted to shelling Druze strongholds to put down resistance to his rule.

Overthrow of Shishakli
Growing discontent eventually led to a coup, in which Shishakli was overthrown in February 1954. The plotters included members of the Syrian Communist Party, Druze officers, Ba'ath Party members, and possibly had Iraqi backing. He had also arrested many active officers in the Syrian Army, including the rising young Adnan al-Malki, also a prominent Baathist. Leading the anti-Shishakli movement were former President Atassi and the veteran Druze leader Sultan al-Atrash. The largest anti-Shishakli conference had been held in Atassi's home in Homs. Shishakli had responded by arresting Atassi and Atrash's sons, Adnan and Mansur (both of whom were ranking politicians in Syria).

When the insurgency reached its peak, Shishakli backed down, refusing to drag Syria into civil war. He fled to Lebanon, but when the Druze leader Kamal Jumblat threatened to have him killed, he fled to Brazil.

Aftermath
After the overthrow of President Shishakli in 1954 coup, he continued political maneuvering supported by competing factions in the military eventually brought Arab nationalist and socialist elements to power. The early years of independence were marked by political instability. Prior to the union between Syria and Egypt in 1958, Shishakli toyed with the idea of returning to Syria to launch a coup d'état, using funds provided by Iraq. The coup was foiled by Syrian intelligence and Shishakli was sentenced to death in absentia.

See also
March 1949 Syrian coup d'état
1963 Syrian coup d'état
1966 Syrian coup d'état
List of modern conflicts in the Middle East

References

Military coups in Syria
Syria
Conflicts in 1954
1954 in Syria
Ba'athism
Arab nationalism in Syria
Arab nationalist rebellions
Arab rebellions in Syria
History of the Ba'ath Party